Alessandro Piperno (born 25 March 1972 in Rome) is an Italian writer and literary critic of Jewish descent, having a Jewish father and a Catholic mother.

He graduated in French Literature at the University of Rome, where he currently teaches and researches. In 2000, he published the controversial critical essay on Marcel Proust, inflammatorily entitled "Proust antiebreo (Proust, Anti-Jew)".

In 2005, he achieved notoriety with his first novel Con le peggiori intenzioni (translated as The Worst Intentions). Following general critical acclaim, and positive reviews on the Corriere della Sera (defining him the "new Proust"), his book became a bestseller in Italy (with 200,000 copies sold in a few months). For this book he won the Premio Campiello for best first novel. The book narrates the story of the Sonnino family spanning half a century, and especially the life of its youngest member, Daniel. Piperno's book attracted noticeable interest with the media, involving Piperno in a number of TV interviews and literary debates. His writing is described both as ironic and ironically self-referential, with a disenchanted view of society and life in general. His critics have emphasised Piperno's difficult storyline and its allegedly confused narration. He states his inspiration as coming from the great literature of the 19th century, as well as that of contemporary America. Besides Proust (naturally), he's been associated to Philip Roth.

In 2012, Piperno won the Premio Strega, Italy's leading literary award, for his novel Inseparabili (2012). It traces the lives of two brothers, Philip and Samuel Pontecorvo, after the painful death of their father Leo Pontecorvo. It is a sequel of Persecuzione published in 2010.

Piperno studied guitar and has a strong interest in music. Until 2005, when he reached success as a writer, he was part of the Roman rock-blues Random as the solo guitarist and singer. He's also a fan of soccer team Lazio.

Bibliography
Proust antiebreo (Proust, Anti-Jew), Franco Angeli Editore (Critical & Linguistic Series), 2000 
Con le peggiori intenzioni, Mondadori (Italian & Foreign Writers), 2005 ; Mondadori (Collana Oscar Bestseller), 2006 
The Worst Intentions (Europa Editions, 2007) 
Il demone reazionario. Sulle tracce del "Baudelaire" di Sartre, Gaffi Editore, (2007)
La favola della vita vera, Corriere della Sera (Corti di Carta), short story, (2007)
Persecuzione. Il fuoco amico dei ricordi, Mondadori, (2010)
Contro la memoria, Roma, Fandango libri, (2012), 
Inseparabili. Il fuoco amico dei ricordi, Mondadori, (2012)
Pubblici infortuni, Mondadori, (2013) 
Dove la storia finisce, Milano, Mondadori, (2016)
Il manifesto del libero lettore: Otto scrittori di cui non so fare a meno, Mondadori, (2017)

Excerpts
"Yes, Swann tries to forget his own Judaism every so often, at least as much as Saint-Loup tries everything to let others forget he is, first of all, a Guermantes. Evidently, however, Judaism as much as aristocratic descent possess such a force that they totally overwhelm the single individual. Swann and Saint-Loup cannot do anything against chromosome enslavement. This is why Swann's face, at the end of his life, becomes as tragic and emaciated as that of Shylock, and why Saint-Loup's backside enlarges so much that it almost overlaps the similarly illustrious one of uncle Charlus."
--(transl. from "A la recherche de Proust", in The Gay Siècle, Monthly Diary, January 2006, p. 40)

"What's the point of writing a book entitled All the Anti-Semitic Jews: From Otto Weininger to Phillip Roth, and including yourself implicitly in that rich list, when everyone knows that you are neither Jewish nor anti-Semitic but would like to be both? For the oldest reason in the world: cunning, sustained by the desire to live, to get the most out of the little life has to offer. Make it extreme. Render it attractive to others, at the cost of the deception inflicted on oneself… A half-Jew against the Jews. A half-Jew who accuses Jews of racism and a half-Catholic who accuses Catholics of ecumenism… that essay of yours is merely a grand anti-Semitic manipulation, devised to the detriment of your guiltless relatives, and to your advantage: that sense of pride that infuses you with a masochistic violence mistaken by too many for intellectual honesty."
--The Worst Intentions (2007)

External links
The essay Proust, Anti-Jew, from website Marcelproust.it (full Italian text)
Profile for the Premio Campiello
"Il caso letterario che scatena le invidie" – Article on La Repubblica
Article on RaiNews24
I dolori del giovane Daniel – Article on Cattolica news, online magazine of the Università Cattolica del Sacro Cuore.
"Un debutto al fuoco della controversia" – A synthesis of critical appraisals on "Le reti di Dedalus", newsletter of the Sindacato Nazionale Scrittori
The polemics on the Feltrinelli network
"The Piperno Case" on Nextbook
Review of The Worst Intentions, on Bookslut
Review of The Worst Intentions, on The Complete Review

Italian male writers
Italian people of Jewish descent
Singers from Rome
Living people
1972 births
Academic staff of the University of Rome Tor Vergata
University of Rome Tor Vergata alumni
21st-century Italian  male singers
Jewish Italian writers